Christopher James Kolodziejski (born February 5, 1961) is a former American football tight end in the National Football League who played for the Pittsburgh Steelers. He played college football for the Wyoming Cowboys.

References

1961 births
Living people
American football tight ends
Pittsburgh Steelers players
Wyoming Cowboys football players
German players of American football